United States Amateur Championship[s] or U.S. Amateur Championship[s] can refer to:

United States Amateur Championships (tennis)
United States Amateur Championship (golf)
United States Amateur Championship (snooker)

See also
United States national amateur boxing championships, winner of the United States National Boxing Championships